Ann Johnston is an American politician who served as the 77th mayor of Stockton, California from 2009 until 2013. She ran for re-election in 2012 but was defeated by Anthony Silva.

Political career
Johnston served as a Lodi Unified School District Board Member from 1979 to 1992. Several years later, in 1994, Johnston ran for the Stockton City Council and won. She successfully ran for re-election in 1998 and left the office in 2002.

Years later, Johnston declared her candidacy for the city's mayor in the 2008 election, and won, receiving 55.8% of the vote. On June 28, 2012, during her tenure as mayor, the City of Stockton filed for Chapter 9 bankruptcy protection, making it the largest city in U.S. history to file for bankruptcy, until Detroit filed for bankruptcy the next year.

Electoral history

Mayor of Stockton

References

School board members in California
Mayors of Stockton, California
Living people
Women mayors of places in California
Year of birth missing (living people)
21st-century American women